Named after Lithuanian-Soviet psychologist Bluma Zeigarnik, in psychology the Zeigarnik effect occurs when an activity that has been interrupted may be more readily recalled. It postulates that people remember unfinished or interrupted tasks better than completed tasks. In Gestalt psychology, the Zeigarnik effect has been used to demonstrate the general presence of Gestalt phenomena: not just appearing as perceptual effects, but also present in cognition.

The Zeigarnik effect should not be confused with the Ovsiankina effect. Maria Ovsiankina, a colleague of Zeigarnik, investigated the effect of task interruption on the tendency to resume the task at the next opportunity.

Overview
Russian psychologist Bluma Zeigarnik first studied the phenomenon after her professor, Gestalt psychologist Kurt Lewin noticed that a waiter had better recollections of still unpaid orders. However, after the completion of the task – after everyone had paid – he was unable to remember any more details of the orders. Zeigarnik then designed a series of experiments to uncover the processes underlying this phenomenon. Her research report was published in 1927, in the journal Psychologische Forschung.

The advantage of remembrance can be explained by looking at Lewin's field theory: a task that has already been started establishes a task-specific tension, which improves cognitive accessibility of the relevant contents. The tension is relieved upon completion of the task, but persists if it is interrupted. Through continuous tension, the content is made more easily accessible, and can be easily remembered.

The Zeigarnik effect suggests that students who suspend their study to perform unrelated activities (such as studying a different subject or playing a game), will remember material better than students who complete study sessions without a break (McKinney 1935; Zeigarnik 1927).

Harden rule
Sportswriter Matt Moore has suggested that the Zeigarnik effect could explain the widespread criticism of the National Basketball Association in allowing free throws for a player "chucking it up whenever a guy comes near them".  There is a stoppage of play with each foul. When repeatedly done, it is felt to build up a cognitive bias against this move. The criticism necessitated a rule change penalizing this activity, known as the Harden Rule, named after its most prominent user, James Harden.

Criticism
The reliability of the effect has been a matter of some controversy.

Several studies, performed later in other countries, attempting to replicate Zeigarnik's experiment, failed to find any significant differences in recall between "finished" and "unfinished" (interrupted) tasks (e.g. Van Bergen, (1968).

Usages

Software 
Zeigarnik effect is being used in some SaaS (Software as a service systems) to onboard users faster and effectively.

Zeigarnik effect emphasizes an "Aha! moment" as an uncompleted task.

Usually, it is implemented as user interactions gamification. Examples include:

 Progress trackers which inform users of how close they are to complete a task. For example, when users see a message like "Your profile is 64% complete", they are more likely to spend a few minutes on providing all missing details.
 Checklists to provide a clear step-by-step on-boarding flow.

See also 
 List of cognitive biases
 Cliffhanger
 Closure (psychology)
 Procrastination

References

Further reading

Zeigarnik
  pp. 300-314 in W. D. Ellis (Ed.), A Sourcebook of Gestalt Psychology, London: Kegan Paul, Trench, Trubner & Co.

Others
 Burke W.W., "A Perspective on the Field of Organization Development and Change: The Zeigarnik Effect", The Journal of Applied Behavioral Science, Vol.47, No.2, (June 2011), pp.143-167.

 Mazur, Elena, "The Zeigarnik Effect and the Concept of Unfinished Business in Gestalt Therapy", British Gestalt Journal, Vol.5, No.1, (1996), pp.18-23.
 Oyama, Yoshinori, Manalo, Emmanuel & Nakatan, Yoshihide (2018), "The Hemingway effect: How failing to finish a task can have a positive effect on motivation", Thinking Skills and Creativity. doi=10.1016/j.tsc.2018.01.001
 Savitsky, K., Medvec, V.H. & Gilovich, T., "Remembering and Regretting: The Zeigarnik Effect and the Cognitive Availability of Regrettable Actions and Inactions", Personality and Social Psychology Bulletin, Vol.23, No.3, (March 1997), pp.248-257. doi=10.1177/0146167297233004
 Syrek, C.J., Weigelt, O., Peifer, C. & Antoni, C.H., "Zeigarnik's sleepless nights: How unfinished tasks at the end of the week impair employee sleep on the weekend through rumination", Journal of Occupational Health Psychology, Vol.22, No.2, (April 2017), pp.225-238.
 Van Bergen, Annie, Task Interruption, North-Holland, (Amsterdam), 1968.
 Weiner, B., Johnson, P.B. & Mehrabian, A., "Achievement Motivation and the Recall of Incomplete and Completed Exam Questions", Journal of Educational Psychology, Vol.59, No.3, (June 1968), pp.181-185.

External links
 Study advice
 Marketing usage

Memory
Educational psychology
Cognitive biases
Learning